1988 Empress's Cup Final was the 10th final of the Empress's Cup competition. The final was played at National Stadium in Tokyo on March 25, 1989. Yomiuri SC Beleza won the championship.

Overview
Defending champion Yomiuri SC Beleza won their 2nd title, by defeating Takatsuki FC 2–0. Yomiuri SC Beleza won the title for 2 years in a row.

Match details

See also
1988 Empress's Cup

References

Empress's Cup
1988 in Japanese women's football